William Neil Boustead (born 13 August 1953) is a former English cricketer.  Boustead was a left-handed batsman who fielded as a wicket-keeper.  He was born in Carlisle, Cumberland.

Boustead made his debut for Cumberland in the 1980 Minor Counties Championship against the Lancashire Second XI.  Boustead played Minor counties cricket for Cumberland from 1980 to 1988, including 45 Minor Counties Championship matches and 4 MCCA Knockout Trophy matches.  In 1984, he made his List A debut against Derbyshire in the NatWest Trophy.  He played two further List A matches for Cumberland, against Middlesex in 1985 and Lancashire in 1986.  In his three List A matches, he scored 22 runs, with a high score of 17*.  His two batting innings ended unbeaten, leaving him without a batting average.  Behind the stumps he took 2 catches.

Boustead runs his own confectionery business in Penrith, Cumbria.

References

External links
Neil Boustead at ESPNcricinfo
Neil Boustead at CricketArchive

1953 births
Living people
Sportspeople from Carlisle, Cumbria
Cricketers from Cumbria
English cricketers
Cumberland cricketers
Wicket-keepers